Janet Leach is an English social worker, known for the role she played as an “appropriate adult" in the questioning of Fred West, one of the two perpetrators of the Gloucester serial murders. For these murders, he and his wife Rosemary West (against whom Leach testified at trial) became notorious. 

The murders–first committed by Fred before he met Rosemary and then by the two of them as co-conspirators–included the kidnapping, rape, torture, and murder of various young women, including their own children and stepchildren. Fred killed himself in his cell while on remand on New Year's Day 1995. Rosemary was convicted and became one of three women in Britain to be handed a whole life tariff (the others being Myra Hindley and, in 2014, Joanne Dennehy).

Life and work with police
An appropriate adult is a parent, guardian, social worker or volunteer who, when a child under 18 or vulnerable adult is called in for questioning by police, helps them understand the legal process. Leach was a thirty-eight-year-old mother of five, divorced from her first husband and training to be a social worker, when in 1994 she was asked to serve in this capacity for Fred West, due to his illiteracy and the severity of the charges levelled against him. 

An unpaid volunteer, Leach knew nothing about West beyond his age and illiteracy, and didn't know what he was accused of before sitting in on the interrogation. When they first met he denied killing his daughter, Heather, to detectives but later confessed to Leach, who, due to a confidentiality agreement, couldn't share the information with anyone, including police. Before West's suicide Leach spent more than 400 hours in his company, and hearing the details of his crimes created a mental strain. 

Eventually, she refused to stay in the role of his appropriate adult unless he confessed to police, which he did. West had developed an attachment to Leach, describing her as his "only friend" and refusing to speak to detectives unless she was present. Leach recalled that speculation about their supposed bond was rife; due to a physical resemblance to Anne McFall, a lover of West's whom he probably murdered (before he met Rosemary), untrue rumours spread that she was related to him, or possibly one of his girlfriends.

Controversy and trial
The nature of Leach's connection with Fred West has been controversial. She stayed in contact with him, even after questioning ended and there was nothing for her to do in her capacity as appropriate adult. Her son, Paul, claimed that she "fell under West's spell" and that she became greatly distressed when she learned that he had killed himself. Janet, however, denied this, saying that her grief was due to West dying before giving her the information needed to find still missing bodies. She said that she kept talking to Fred to find out what had happened to his victims:

"I was desperate. I couldn’t sleep at night. I kept having nightmares about all those poor girls in the cellar. But I felt I had to keep talking to Fred. Otherwise, how would their families ever know what had happened to them?"

The stress she was under contributed to a dramatic moment in the trial of the Wests.  Unexpectedly called to testify against Rosemary, Leach had a stroke in the witness box after falsely claiming that she had not signed a deal with the press to sell her story. In fact, she had sold her story to the Daily Mirror and admitted this when she returned to the witness box several days later, following treatment at a hospital.

Aftermath
In 1997, Leach lodged a complaint with the Court of Appeal seeking the right to sue police for compensation on the grounds that she suffered posttraumatic stress disorder as a result of her work as an appropriate adult for Fred West. Unlike the officers and defence solicitor involved in the case, she had not been offered counselling, as she was an unpaid volunteer. In November 1997 her original claim for compensation was thrown out by a judge, who ruled that the police did not owe her a duty of care. Her defence team put forward that a duty of care was appropriate since she had been asked to sit with one of the most notorious criminals of the 20th century.

Dramatisation
The 2011 TV drama Appropriate Adult, starring Emily Watson as Leach, focused on the part played by Leach in the police interviews with Fred West, in the visits to the crime scenes, and in Leach's prison visits and correspondence with West.  Commenting on the series, retired police officer Bennet, who was in charge of the investigation, said that although the portrayals of Fred and Rose West were "hauntingly accurate", providing "an even deeper insight" into their psyche, Leach's role in the case was exaggerated. Paul Leach, Janet's eldest son, was upset at the way his mother was portrayed in the TV series.

In defence of Leach, Watson said: "Everyone involved in the case entered a moral universe for which they were completely unequipped". Writer Neil McKay commented: "I do feel that Janet’s story in many ways reflects how any of us would have reacted".

References

Year of birth missing (living people)
Living people
British social workers